Éric Bédard (born December 17, 1976, in Sainte-Thècle, Quebec) is a Canadian short track speed skater who has won 4 Olympic medals (2 gold, 1 silver, 1 bronze). He participated in three individual events at the 2006 Winter Olympics and finished  fourth in the 500 meters. He also led a team into the 5000 meter relay, winning the silver medal. He has been a longtime member of Canada's short track team and has won four medals in three Olympic games: bronze in the 1,000 meters in Nagano, and two golds and a silver in the 5,000 meter relay. He has also had a lot of success at the World Championships, capturing 10 medals, including three golds (5,000 m relay in 2005 and 1998 and 500 m in 2000).

Bédard was national squad coach of Germany from 2008 till 2010. From 2010 until 2014 he coached the Italian national team. He also coaches the Canadian national team.

See also
 Canadian short track speed skating all-time medals list

References

External links
 Bedard's web site 
 

1976 births
Canadian male short track speed skaters
Living people
Short track speed skaters at the 1998 Winter Olympics
Short track speed skaters at the 2002 Winter Olympics
Short track speed skaters at the 2006 Winter Olympics
Sportspeople from Quebec
Olympic gold medalists for Canada
Olympic silver medalists for Canada
Olympic bronze medalists for Canada
Olympic short track speed skaters of Canada
Olympic medalists in short track speed skating
Medalists at the 2006 Winter Olympics
Medalists at the 2002 Winter Olympics
Medalists at the 1998 Winter Olympics
World Short Track Speed Skating Championships medalists
20th-century Canadian people
21st-century Canadian people